The MAMA Award for Album of the Year is a daesang (or grand prize) award presented by CJ E&M (Mnet) at the annual MAMA Awards. It was first awarded at the 8th Mnet Asian Music Awards ceremony held in 2006; SG Wannabe won the award for their album The 3rd Masterpiece, and it is given in honor of a solo or group with the best recording album in the music industry released during the year.

Winners and nominees

2000s

2010s

2020s

Records

Most nominations

Most awards

See also
 Melon Music Award for Album of the Year

Notes

References

External links
 Mnet Asian Music Awards official website

MAMA Awards
Album awards